Live at the Village Vanguard is a live album by American jazz bassist Christian McBride. It was recorded over three consecutive nights in December 2014 at the famous jazz club Village Vanguard in New York City and released on  via Mack Avenue label. The cover of "Cherokee" featured in the album won the Grammy Award for Best Improvised Jazz Solo at the 58th Annual Grammy Awards in 2016. This is the thirteenth full-length album recorded under his leadership.

Reception
Colin Fleming of JazzTimes noted "Cutting an album at the Village Vanguard is both a rite of passage and an attempt to take one’s own place in a particularly hallowed hall of live recordings. But it’s evident here, with the opening take of Wes Montgomery’s “Fried Pies,” that Christian McBride’s trio is more than capable of advancing on both fronts. McBride dubs drummer Ulysses Owens Jr. his American Express, as he’s loath to leave home without him, and with the kick the man provides it’s no wonder. The opener has a taut, bracing solo that pianist Christian Sands helps transition into a percussive duet before the central refrain comes roaring back in, McBride’s bass encircling the driving progressions of his counterparts".

On Audiophilia.com Anthony Kershaw wrote "Typical of McBride, the charts are hard driving and swing. There's lots of technique on show, but great musicianship and musicality, too. The audience loves it and you can feel the energy in the room... This album has a lot of his debut album's energy. His improvisational style has developed, especially on ballads, but his ingenue talent was so well defined in 1994 that this album is simply an emphasis on it. There was a lot to love from the beginning. Live at the Village Vanguard has a nice mix of up tempo original charts, standards (The Lady Of My Life, Cherokee, Down By The Riverside), covers and ballads."

Track listing

Personnel 
Band
Christian McBride – bass
Christian Sands – piano
Ulysses Owens – drums

  
Production
Keith H. Brown – illustrations
Christian McBride – producer
Randall Kennedy – creative director
Raj Naik – art direction, design
Trevor Smith – photography
Gretchen Valade – executive producer
Todd Whitelock – mixing
Mark Wilder – mastering

Chart performance

References

External links 
 Christian McBride Discography

 

2015 live albums
Christian McBride albums
Mack Avenue Records albums
Albums recorded at the Village Vanguard